City In Fear is a 10-episode documentary television programme produced by 44 Blue Productions in the United States for the television station MSNBC.

This documentary investigates many violent events that shocked communities across the US in modern history, such as the 1993 Waco Siege, the 1999 Columbine High School massacre, the Beltway sniper attacks and the Los Angeles riots of 1992. It reveals the events that led up to each case; the causes of the events, as well as the aftermath and how it affected the community. It also investigated whether each event could have been prevented or stopped sooner.

List of subjects investigated 
Columbine High School Massacre
Gianni Versace Murder
the Beltway sniper attacks
LA Riots
The Hillside Strangler
BTK (Dennis Rader)
Chicago Tylenol murders
 The Night Stalker (Richard Ramírez)
Atlanta child murders

External links
 44 Blue Productions Website
 RadioTimes
 

MSNBC original programming
English-language television shows
2005 American television series debuts
2000s American television news shows
2000s American documentary television series